Glipa is a genus of beetles in the family Mordellidae, containing the following species:

 Glipa acutimaculata Takakuwa, 2000
 Glipa afrirozui Nakane, 1949
 Glipa albannulata Takakuwa, 2000
 Glipa alboscutellata Kônô, 1934
 Glipa andamana Píc, 1941
 Glipa angustatissima Píc, 1911
 Glipa angustilineata Fan & Yang, 1993
 Glipa annulata (Redtenbacher, 1868)
 Glipa apicalis Píc, 1922
 Glipa asahinai Nakane & Nomura, 1950
 Glipa atripennis Píc, 1923
 Glipa atriventris Píc, 1923
 Glipa aurata Ray, 1930
 Glipa australiasis Píc, 1941
 Glipa azumai Nakane, 1950
 Glipa baeri Píc, 1917
 Glipa bakeri Ray, 1930
 Glipa balabacana Píc, 1917
 Glipa bandana Píc, 1932
 Glipa basiaurea Takakuwa, 2000
 Glipa basilewskyi Ermisch, 1952
 Glipa batjanensis Píc, 1917
 Glipa bicolor 
 Glipa bifasciata Píc, 1920
 Glipa bisbimaculata Píc, 1911
 Glipa brevicauda Blair, 1931
 Glipa brunneipennis Ermisch, 1955
 Glipa cinereonigra (Fairmaire, 1893)
 Glipa cladoda Fan & Yang, 1993
 Glipa curtopyga Fan & Yang, 1993
 Glipa diversepubens Píc, 1941
 Glipa dohertyi Píc, 1932
 Glipa elongata McLeay
 Glipa fasciata Kôno, 1928
 Glipa favareli Píc, 1917
 Glipa flava Fan & Yang, 1993
 Glipa formosana Píc, 1911
 Glipa franciscoloi Takakuwa, 2000
 Glipa fukiensis Ermisch, 1940
 Glipa gigantea Píc, 1911
 Glipa gounellei Píc, 1917
 Glipa gracillima Takakuwa, 2000
 Glipa griseopubescens Franciscolo, 1952
 Glipa guamensis Blair, 1942
 Glipa hatayamai Takakuwa, 2000
 Glipa hieroglyphica Schwarz, 1878
 Glipa hilaris (Say, 1835)
 Glipa impressipennis Píc, 1924
 Glipa inexpectata Takakuwa, 2000
 Glipa inflammata (LeConte, 1862)
 Glipa insignata Píc, 1941
 Glipa iridescens Franciscolo, 1952
 Glipa ishigakiana Kônô, 1932
 Glipa isolata Ray, 1930
 Glipa karubei Takakuwa, 1993
 Glipa kashiwaii Takakuwa, 2000
 Glipa klapperichi Ermisch, 1940
 Glipa komiyai Takakuwa, 2000
 Glipa kurosawai Takakuwa, 1985
 Glipa kusamai Takakuwa, 1999
 Glipa laosensis Píc, 1922
 Glipa latenotata Píc, 1923
 Glipa latepyga Ermisch, 1952
 Glipa longipennis Fairmaire, 1905
 Glipa longispinosa Takakuwa, 2000
 Glipa lottini Boisduval
 Glipa luteofasciata Píc, 1930
 Glipa luteopubens Píc, 1936
 Glipa maruyamai Takakuwa, 2000
 Glipa masatakai Chûjô, 1962
 Glipa matsukai Takakuwa, 2000
 Glipa nigronotata Píc, 1941
 Glipa nigrosignata Chevrolat, 1882
 Glipa novaguineae Franciscolo, 1952
 Glipa obliquivittata Fan & Yang, 1993
 Glipa obliterata Píc, 1932
 Glipa oculata (Say, 1835)
 Glipa ogasawarensis Kônô, 1928
 Glipa ohgushii Chûjô, 1957
 Glipa ohmomoi Takakuwa, 2000
 Glipa ornata Fairmaire, 1895
 Glipa oshimana Nomura, 1966
 Glipa oxygonia (Franciscolo, 1952)
 Glipa palawana Píc, 1923
 Glipa paulonotata Píc, 1941
 Glipa pici Ermisch, 1940
 Glipa pseudofasciata Fan & Yang, 1993
 Glipa quadrifasciata Chevrolat, 1882
 Glipa quiquefasciata Píc, 1933
 Glipa rectefasciata Píc, 1941
 Glipa rufomaculata Píc, 1923
 Glipa rufonotata Píc, 1917
 Glipa rufotincta Píc, 1917
 Glipa sachiyoae Takakuwa, 2000
 Glipa sanfilippoi Franciscolo, 1998
 Glipa satoi Nakane & Nomura, 1950
 Glipa satorum Takakuwa, 2003
 Glipa sauteri Píc, 1911
 Glipa separata Píc, 1941
 Glipa siamemsis Píc, 1923
 Glipa stenaliodes Blair, 1931
 Glipa suberecta Píc, 1923
 Glipa subflava Takakuwa, 2000
 Glipa subsinuata Píc, 1917
 Glipa subsinuatipennis Píc, 1936
 Glipa testaceicoxis Píc, 1917
 Glipa textilis (Montrouzier, 1855)
 Glipa thoracica Horak, 1994
 Glipa torneensis Píc, 1917
 Glipa tricolor (Wiedem, 1823)
 Glipa tripartita Píc, 1934
 Glipa uenoi Takakuwa, 1986
 Glipa vittatipennis Píc, 1928
 Glipa watanabei Takakuwa, 2000
 Glipa watanabeorum Takakuwa, 2002
 Glipa zhangi Fan & Yang, 1993

References